Dissomorphia australiaria is a moth of the family Geometridae first described by Achille Guenée in 1857. It is found in Australia.

The larvae feed on Acacia dealbata and Acacia mearnsii.

References

Macariini